A small number of municipalities in Serbia held local elections in 2010. These were not part of the country's regular cycle of local elections but instead took place in certain jurisdictions where either the local government had fallen or the last local elections for four-year terms had taken place in 2006.

All local elections in 2010 were held under proportional representation. Mayors were not directly elected but were instead chosen by elected members of the local assemblies. Parties were required to cross a five per cent electoral threshold (of all votes, not only of valid votes), although this requirement was waived for parties representing national minority communities.

Results

Vojvodina

Odžaci
Local elections were held in Odžaci on 24 January 2010. The local assembly had become dysfunctional in the previous sitting, after the Socialist Party of Serbia withdrew its support from an administration led by the Serbian Radical Party. Veroljub Marković of the Democratic Party led a provisional administration prior to the vote.

Predrag Cvetanović of the Democratic Party was chosen as mayor after the election. He stood down in 2012 after being elected to the Assembly of Vojvodina and was replaced by Izabela Serić from the same party.

Central Serbia

Aranđelovac
Elections were held in Aranđelovac on 25 April 2010, with repeat voting in some communities on 2 May 2010. The municipality's previous mayor, Radosav Švabić of the Serbian Radical Party, had been arrested in June 2009, and the assembly had not sat for several months before the local government was dissolved in November. Vlada Gajić of the Democratic Party led a provisional administration prior to the vote.

Vlada Gajić of the Democratic Party was confirmed as mayor after the election. He was replaced by Bojan Radović of the Progressive Party in August 2012.

The leader of the "Aranđelovac in Belgrade–Movement for the Development of Serbia" list was Zoran Zečević, who would later be elected to the national assembly as a member of the far-right Serbian Party Oathkeepers.

Reference

Local elections in Serbia
Loc